"The Kind of Heart That Breaks" is a single by Canadian country music artist Chris Cummings. Released in late 1997, it was the first single from Cummings' album Chris Cummings. The song reached #1 on the RPM Country Tracks chart in February 1998 and #50 on the Billboard Hot Country Singles & Tracks chart.

Chart performance

Year-end charts

References

1997 singles
Chris Cummings songs
Song recordings produced by Jim Ed Norman
Songs written by Kim Tribble
1997 songs
Songs written by Chris Cummings
Warner Records singles